General elections were held in Lesotho between 27 and 29 March 1993, the first full elections since the ruling Basotho National Party annulled the results of the 1970 elections, which they had lost to the Basutoland Congress Party. Of the 736,930 registered voters, 532,678 cast valid votes.

The BCP were victorious in the election, winning all 65 of the seats in the National Assembly. Its leader, Ntsu Mokhehle, became Prime Minister.

Results

References

Lesotho
Elections in Lesotho
1993 in Lesotho
election, Lesotho
Election and referendum articles with incomplete results